The Maryland gubernatorial election of 2018 was held on November 6, 2018.

The County elected offices include: County Council, State's Attorney, Sheriff, Clerk of the Circuit Court, Judge of the Orphans' Court, Register of Wills, and Board of Education. Please also see Maryland County Executive Election, 2018.

Allegany County

County Commissioner 

 Brodie, Creade Jr.
 Caporale, Dave
 Leptic, Michael
 Powell, Darrell Lee
 Shade, Jake
 Wollett, Steve

State's Attorney 

 Twigg, Michael O.

Clerk of the Circuit Court 

 Lindsey, Dawne

Register of Wills 

 Goad, David A.
 Pirolozzi, Mary Beth

Judge of the Orphans' Court 

 Crossland, Edward C.
 Feldstein, Al
 May, Donna F.

Sheriff 

 Robertson, Craig

Board of Education 

 Bohn, David A.
 Farrell, Bob
 Foote, Wayne T.
 Frank, Debra
 Hadley, Nicholas T.
 Jackson, Carmen B.
 Kasecamp, Terry Lynn
 Robertson, Jim "Snake"

Anne Arundel County

County Council

District 1 

 Burns, Kimberly McCoy (R)
 Lacey, Sarah (D)

District 2 

 Gardner, Tom (R)
 Pickard, Allison (D)

District 3 

 Ritchie, Debbie
 Volke, Nathan

District 4 

 Pruski, Andrew C.
 Snow, Torrey J.

District 5 

 Fiedler, Amanda
 Myers, Dawn Gough

District 6 

 Brannigan Rodvien, Lisa
 Christman, Michael

District 7 

 Haire, Jessica
 Kitchin, James

State's Attorney 

 Adams, Wes
 Leitess, Anne Colt

Clerk of the Circuit Court 

 Arnold, Doug
 Poyer, Scott

Register of Wills 

 Janosky, Joseph J.
 Parker, Lauren M.

Judge of the Orphans' Court 

 Carr-York, Maureen
 Gipson, Vickie
 Jacobsen, Torrey Jr.
 Phelps, Nancy
 Rzepkowski, Alan

Sheriff 

 Fredericks, Jim
 Williams, James

Board of Education

District 1 

 Antwine, Candace C.W.
 Starr, David P.

District 4 

 Ellis, Melissa
 Hummer, Julie K.

District 5 

 Gilleland, Terry R. Jr.
 Schallheim, Dana

District 7 

 Corkadel, Michelle
 Hicks, Laticia

Baltimore City

State's Attorney 

 Mosby, Marilyn J.

Clerk of the Circuit Court 

 Bentley, Marilyn

Register of Wills 

 Conaway, Belinda K.

Judge of the Orphans' Court 

 Bernstein, Charles "Chuck"
 Garrett, Lewyn Scott
 Loewenthal, Michele E.

Sheriff 

 Anderson, John W.
 Wiggins, David Anthony

Baltimore County

County Council

District 1 

 Melcavage, Pete II
 Quirk, Tom

District 2 

 Lee, Michael
 Patoka, Izzy

District 3 

 Ebacher, Colleen Marie
 Kach, Wade

District 4 

 Jones, Julian E. Jr.

District 5 

 Foley, Alex
 Marks, David

District 6 

 Bevins, Cathy
 Nawrocki, Ryan

District 7 

 Crandell, Todd
 Weir, Brian

States Attorney 

 Shellenberger, Scott

Clerk of the Circuit Court 

 Hill, Deb
 Ensor, Julie

Register of Wills 

 Roger, Jane
 Connolly, Grace G.

Judge of the Orphans' Court 

 Evans, William R. "Bill"
 Fisher, Juliet
 Frank, Arthur M.

Sheriff 

 Magee, Carl H. Jr.
 Fisher, R. Jay

Board of Education

District 1 

 Gresick, Matt
 Mack, Lisa A.

District 2 

 Glasser, Anthony Miles
 Pasteur, Cheryl E.

District 3 

 Causey, Kathleen
 Konka, Paul V.

District 4 

 Scott, Makeda
 White, Kathleen

District 5 

 Beilenson, Peter
 Henn, Julie C.

District 6 

 Kitlowski, Edward
 Rowe, Lily

District 7 

 Feuer, William
 McMillion, Rod

Calvert County

County Commissioner

At Large 

 Hance, Earl "Buddy"
 Weems, Steve
 Bennett, Matt
 Brown, Greg

District 1 

 Hart, Mike
 Powell, Tricia V.

District 2 

 Hutchins, Thomas E. "Tim"
 Hance-Wells, Susie

District 3 

 McConkey, Kelly D.
 Budd, Holly Heintz

Treasurer 

 Tracy-Soper, Nova

State's Attorney 

 Rappaport, Andrew S.

Clerk of the Circuit Court 

 Smith, Kathy P.

Register of Wills 

 Lynch, Mark S.
 Phipps, Margaret H.

Judge of the Orphans' Court 

 Downs, Leslie M.
 LeBlanc, Ted
 Sabedra, Derek
 Fowler, Tammy
 Pelagatti, Thomas M.

Sheriff 

 Evans, Mike
 Hawkins, Michael

Board of Education

At Large 

 Cousins, Pamela L.
 Phalen, William J. "Bill"

Caroline County

County Commissioner 

 Franklin, Daniel
 Levengood, Wilbur Jr.
 Porter, Larry C.
 Crouse, Nevin

State's Attorney 

 Riley, Joe

Clerk of the Circuit Court 

 Lord, Terry
 Gallagher, Missy

Register of Wills 

 Phelps, Jim

Judge of the Orphans' Court 

 Adams, Ellery
 Fearins, Ron
 Porter, Jeff

Sheriff 

 Bounds, Randy
 Biddle, Steven Paul

Board of Education

District 3 

 Newcomb, James Allan Jr.
 Thompson, Sherone E.

Carroll County

County Commissioner

District 1 

 Wantz, Stephen Albert

District 2 

 Weaver, C. Richard

District 3 

 Frazier, Dennis E.
 Warburton, Maria

District 4 

 Bouchat, Christopher Eric
 Johnson, Paul

District 5 

 Rothstein, Ed

State's Attorney 

 DeLeonardo, Brian

Clerk of the Circuit Court 

 DeWees, Heather
 Connolly, Terrie

Register of Wills 

 Zimmermann, Paul G.

Judge of the Orphans' Court 

 Bair, Margaret "Peggy"
 Coles, Charles M. Jr.
 Sealing, Donald II
 Harrison, Charles E.
 Rammes, Frank Henry
 Riley, Anita

Sheriff 

 DeWees, Jim

Board of Education 

 Battaglia, Tara
 Dorsey, Patricia Ann
 Howard, Doug
 Kiler, Kenneth A.
 Kowalski, Mary
 Lord, Bob

Cecil County

County Council

District 2 

 Coutz, Bill
 Kirk, Cody

District 3 

 Miller, Al

District 4 

 Patchell, George C.

State's Attorney 

 Bessicks, Amanda

Clerk of the Circuit Court 

 Notarcola, Charlene M.

Register of Wills 

 Nickle, "Lyn" Allyn Price

Judge of the Orphans' Court 

 Amato, Bob
 Crouch, Carolyn L.
 Harris, Bill
 Brown, Gary A.

Sheriff 

 Adams, Scott A.

Board of Education

District 3 

 Stephens, Christie

District 4 

 Malesh, William H.

District 5 

 Hawley, Diana
 Jones, Evan T. Jr.

Charles County

County Commissioner

President 

 Thompson, Henry
 Collins, Reuben B. II

District 1 

 Crawford, Joe
 Bowling, Gilbert "B.J."

District 2 

 Coates, Thomasina "Sina"

District 3 

 Stewart, Amanda

District 4 

 Ashburn, James
 Rucci, Bobby

State's Attorney 

 Covington, Anthony "Tony"

Clerk of the Circuit Court 

 Hancock, Sharon "Sherri"

Register of Wills 

 Hennessy, Loraine Davies

Judge of the Orphans' Court 

 Berry, J. Lorraine
 Breck, Darlene M.
 Kearney, Reginald

Sheriff 

 Berry, Troy

Board of Education 

 Abell, Jennifer S.
 Battle-Lockhart, Tajala "Taj"
 Brown, Elizabeth "Liz"
 Butler-Washington, Dottery
 Coker, Leslie
 Hancock, David
 Kelly, Victoria "Vicki" Talley
 Lukas, Michael "Mike"
 Marshall, Margaret T.
 McGraw, Virginia "Ginny"
 Palko, Barbara "Barb"
 Pitts, Robert Michael
 Sherrod, Nashonda
 Wilson, Latina "Tina"

Dorchester County

County Council

District 1 

 Satterfield, Don B.
 Newcomb, Jay Leonard

District 2 

 Nichols, William

District 3 

 Travers, Ricky C. Sr.

District 4 

 Pfeffer, Lenny

District 5 

 Nagel, Libby Handley

State's Attorney 

 Jones, William H.

Clerk of the Circuit Court 

 Craig, Amy J.

Register of Wills 

 Colburn, Richard F.
 Lewis, Doris Keene

Judge of the Orphans' Court

District 1 

 Ames, George Robert Jr.

District 2 

 Todd, Carolyn I.
 Travers, Calvin

Sheriff 

 Robbins, Gregory S. Sr.
 Phillips, James W. Jr.

Board of Education

District 2 

 Hull, LeOtha N.

District 4 

 Hubbard, Sheri Robinson
 Gorsuch, Bill

Frederick County

County Council

At Large 

 Dacey, Philip
 Farrar, Danny
 Hagen, Kai John
 Jessee, Susan Reeder
 Otis, Bud

District 1 

 Grubb, Kevin
 Donald, Jerry

District 2 

 McKay, Steven
 Jarosinski, Lisa

District 3 

 Parsley, Joe
 Keegan-Ayer, M. C.

District 4 

 Trout, Jimmy W.
 Fitzwater, Jessica

District 5 

 Blue, Michael J.
 Bohrer, Shannon

State's Attorney 

 Smith, Charlie

Clerk of the Circuit Court 

 Dalton, Sandra K.
 LeRoux, Megan

Register of Wills 

 Keller, Sharon
 Atherholt, Melissa

Judge of the Orphans' Court 

 Browning, Douglas D.
 Rolle, Mary
 Wilson, Nate
 Daniels, John
 Nicholson, Bonnie L.
 Sheppard, Eugene N.

Sheriff 

 Jenkins, Chuck
 Bickel, Karl

Board of Education 

 Barrett, Liz
 Mason, Jay
 Miller, April Fleming
 Raynor, Camden
 Rose, Cindy
 Williams, Kim L.
 Yoho, Karen
 Young, Brad W.

Garrett County

County Commissioner

District 1 

 Tichnell, S. Larry
 Carbone, Judy A.

District 2 

 Edwards, Paul C.

District 3 

 Hinebaugh, Jim Jr.

State's Attorney 

 Welch, Lisa Thayer

Clerk of the Circuit Court 

 Miller, Timothy W.

Register of Wills 

 Watson, Rita L.

Judge of the Orphans' Court 

 Duggan, Dan
 Sanders, Fred
 Turney, Jack Rush

Sheriff 

 Corley, Robert E.

Board of Education

District 1 

 Paugh, Matthew A.

District 2 

 Glotfelty, Rodney B.
 Sorber, Nathan M.

District 3 

 Gregg, Fred
 Rinker, Monica L.

Harford County

County Council

President 

 Vincenti, Patrick
 Hines, Frank "Bud"

District A 

 Blasdell, Donna
 Johnson, Andre V.

District B 

 Oshinsky, Suzanne
 Woods, Joe

District C 

 Giangiordano, Tony "G"
 Kukurin, Karen

District D 

 Salvatore, Jean M.
 Shrodes, Chad R.

District E 

 Johnson, Bridgette
 Wagner, Robert S.

District F 

 Beulah, Curtis L.
 Roche, Winifred "Wini"

State's Attorney 

 Peisinger, Albert
 Taylor, Carlos R.

Clerk of the Circuit Court 

 Reilly, James
 Kurth, Sabra M.

Register of Wills 

 Hopkins, Derek K.
 Lucas, Jo Wanda Strickland

Sheriff 

 Boardman, Christopher C.
 Gahler, Jeffrey R.

Board of Education

District A 

 Robinson, Jansen M.

District B 

 Bauer, David

District C 

 Antal, Jim
 Carmello, Kathryn

District D 

 Rush, Tamera
 Williamson, Alfred "AL"

District E 

 Gauthier, Rachel
 Kaff, Art

District F 

 Fitzpatrick, Thomas
 Karwacki, Sonja

Howard County

County Council

District 1 

 Kathuria, Raj (R)
 Walsh, Elizabeth "Liz" (D)

District 2 

 Jones, Opel (D)
 Liao, John (R)

District 3 

 Rigby, Christiana (D)

District 4 

 Jung, Deb (D)
 Kim, Lisa (R)

District 5 

 Williams, China (D)
 Yungmann, David (R)

State's Attorney 

 Gibson, Rich
 Oldham, Kim Yon

Clerk of the Circuit Court 

 Jareaux, Marlena
 Robey, Wayne A.

Register of Wills 

 Conley, Shawn
 Macfarlane, Byron

Judge of the Orphans' Court 

 Dodd, Anne L.
 Fitch, Elizabeth Ann
 Turner, Leslie Smith

Sheriff 

 Harris, Marcus
 McMahon, Bill

Board of Education 

 Cutroneo, Vicky
 Glascock, Bob
 Mackey, Danny
 Mallo, Jen
 Miller, Robert Wayne
 Pandey, Anita
 Taj, Sabina
 Wu, Chao

Kent County

County Commissioner 

 Fithian, Ron
 Jacob, Bob
 Mason, "Tom"
 Pickrum, William
 Short, William
 Timberman, Thomas F.

State's Attorney 

 Strong, Robert H.
 DiGregory, Bryan

Clerk of the Circuit Court 

 Mumford, Mark L.

Register of Wills 

 Osborn, "Kristi"

Judge of the Orphans' Court 

 Boyer, Elroy G. Jr.
 Carroll, Elizabeth "Betty"
 Nickerson, Amy L.
 Schauber, Allan

Sheriff 

 Price, John F.

Board of Education 

 Costa, Wendy
 Johnson, Nivek M.
 McGee, "Trish"
 Sullivan, Francoise

Montgomery County

Prince George's County

Queen Anne's County

County Commissioner

At Large 

 Harrison, Elaine
 Moran, Jim

District 1 

 LaMana, Dino Romano
 Wilson, Jack

District 2 

 Tilghman, Benjamin
 Wilson, Steve

District 3 

 Coulter, Jim
 Dumenil, Phil

District 4 

 Corchiarino, Chris
 Krueger, Deborah

State's Attorney 

 Richardson, Lance G.

Clerk of the Circuit Court 

 Hager, Katherine Beane

Register of Wills 

 Cook, Laura Nan

Judge of the Orphans' Court 

 Cascia, Kimberly Jean
 McNeil, Fred M.
 Pauls, Willie Mae
 Stires, John C.
 Walsh, Thomas
 Wargotz, Eric

Sheriff 

 Hofmann, Gary
 Rhodes, Kevin

Board of Education

At Large 

 Harper, Tammy
 Walker, Mary Ellen

District 1 

 Morrissette, Michele Lynn

District 2 

 O'Connor, Carrie Lee
 Smith, Richard "Dick"

St. Mary's County

County Commissioner

President 

 Guy, Randy
 Thompson, J. Howard

District 1 

 Colvin, Eric Scott
 Ridgell, Timothy

District 2 

 Frederick, Rose V.
 Hewitt, Michael

District 3 

 O'Connor, John

District 4 

 Morgan, Todd B.

Treasurer 

 Kelly, Christy

State's Attorney 

 Fritz, Richard D.

Clerk of the Circuit Court 

 Burch, Debbie Mills
 Wheeler, Faye

Register of Wills 

 Superior, Phyllis A.

Judge of the Orphans' Court 

 Babcock, Albert "Allie"
 Curtis, Deborah J.
 Mattingly, Bill
 Randall, Julie
 White, Michael R.

Sheriff 

 Belleavoine, Ted
 Cameron, Tim

Board of Education

District 1 

 Weaver, Rita

District 3 

 Bailey, Karin

Somerset County

County Commissioner

District 1 

 Mathies, Craig N.

District 2 

 Fisher, Charles
 Simpkins, Rex

District 3 

 Nissley, Deborah Ann
 Willing, Eldon

District 4 

 Ballard, Ken
 Laird, Charles

District 5 

 Corbin, Mike
 Laird, Randy

State's Attorney 

 Garner, Wess

Clerk of the Circuit Court 

 Frederick, Lionel
 Horner, Charles T.

Register of Wills 

 Ward, Keith B.

Judge of the Orphans' Court 

 Crossan, Kathleen
 Hall, Libby
 McCready, Bob

Sheriff 

 Howard, Ronald

Board of Education

District 1 

 Bagley, Charles David Jr.
 Nicholson, Penny

District 3 

 Wells, Robert Thomas

District 5 

 Green-Gale, Margo

Talbot County

County Council 

 Callahan, Chuck
 Divilio, Frank
 Haythe, Keasha N.
 Hyman, Naomi
 Lesher, Pete
 Pack, Corey W.
 Potter, Rosalee "Rose"
 Price, Laura Everngam
 Scott-Taylor, Maureen
 Williams, Jennifer L.

State's Attorney 

 Patterson, Scott G.

Clerk of the Circuit Court 

 Adkins, Monica "DeeDee"
 Duvall, Kathi Dulin

Register of Wills 

 Campen, Patricia "Patti" E.

Judge of the Orphans' Court 

 Carroll, Paul S.
 Foster, Philip Carey
 Howard, Will
 Johnson, Joel Marcus
 Wheeler, David J.

Sheriff 

 Gamble, Joseph
 Green, Wanda V.

Board of Education

District 1 

 Sampson, Otis

District 3 

 Garman, Michael

District 4 

 Jackson, Emily
 Sparks, Martha Darling

District 6 

 Allen, Robyn
 Cornette, Judith A.
 Wheeler, Mary E.

District 7 

 Motovidlak, April

Washington County

County Commissioner 

 Baker, Terry L.
 Beall, Brian
 Brightman, Donna L.
 Cline, Jeff
 Forrest, Ed
 Jones, Harry
 Keefer, Wayne K.
 Meinelschmidt, Cort
 Paul, Elizabeth
 Wagner, Randall

Treasurer 

 Hershey, Todd L.

State's Attorney 

 Semler, Bernard
 Strong, Charles P.  Jr.

Clerk of the Circuit Court 

 Tucker, Kevin

Register of Wills 

 Malott, Jason A.

Judge of the Orphans' Court 

 Banister, Paul D.
 Dunn, Andrew
 May, Karen L.
 Novinger, Frank E.
 Wood, Bonnie

Sheriff 

 Albert, Brian
 Mullendore, Doug

Board of Education 

 Fischer, Jacqueline B.
 Guessford, Mike
 Gwizdala, Terri A.
 Krowka, John
 Murray, Linda

Wicomico County

County Council

At Large 

 Brewington, Julie D.
 Cannon, John T.
 Gould, Jamaad
 McCain, William R.

District 1 

 Davis, Ernest

District 2 

 Kilmer, Marc
 Scott, Alexander W.

District 3 

 Dodd, Larry W.
 Gregory, Michele

District 4 

 Cain, Suzanah
 Hastings, Josh

District 5 

 Holloway, Joe

State's Attorney 

 Dykes, Jamie
 Mitchell, W. Seth

Clerk of the Circuit Court 

 McAllister, James "Bo"
 Welch, Christopher S.

Register of Wills 

 Lemon, Karen A.

Judge of the Orphans' Court 

 Cantwell, Grover Green Jr.
 Bowen, Mark S.
 Bright, Melissa Pollitt
 Evans, Dean Jones

Sheriff 

 Lewis, Mike

Board of Education 
Beginning with the November 2018 election, the board transitioned from being appointed by the governor to fully elected, and non-partisan.  It has one member elected from each of the five council districts, plus two elected at-large.

At Large 

 Cooper, Tyrone
 Fitzgerald, Donald L.
 Murray, Michael G.
 Watson, Talana D.

District 1 

 Bradley, Michelle
 Brown, Allen C.

District 2 

 Malone, Gene

District 3 

 Goslee, David L. Sr.
 Turner, William

District 4 

 Plotts, David
 Suthowski, Ann Brittingham

District 5 

 Palmer, John

Worcester County

County Commissioner

District 1 

 Lockfaw, Merrill W. Jr.
 Nordstrom, Joshua C.

District 2 

 Purnell, Diana

District 3 

 Church, Bud
 Tyndall, Zackery

District 4 

 Elder, Theodore "Ted"
 Shockley, Virgil L.

District 5 

 Bertino, Chip
 Butler, Judy

District 6 

 Bunting, Madison "Jim" Jr.

District 7 

 Mitrecic, Joseph M.

State's Attorney 

 Heiser, Kris

Clerk of the Circuit Court 

 Braniecki, Susan Richardson

Register of Wills 

 Caudell, Nicole
 Westcott, Terri Delaney

Judge of the Orphans' Court 

 Diffendal, Mike
 Hess, Linda M.
 Jacobs, Cheryl

Sheriff 

 Crisafulli, Matt

Board of Education

District 1 

 Buchanan, Bill

District 4 

 Gordy, Bill

District 6 

 Cropper, Eric

District 7 

 Ferrante, Todd

References 

County offices
County government in Maryland
Maryland county offices